"Let Love Rule" is the debut single by American musician Lenny Kravitz and appeared on his debut studio album, Let Love Rule (1989). The song charted at number 23 on the Mainstream Rock Tracks charts, and number 5 on the US Modern Rock charts. Then-wife Lisa Bonet appears in the video for the single.

In April 2009, a remix of the song by the French house duo Justice, was released to help promote the 20th anniversary deluxe edition of the album.

The song is available as a download for Rock Band and Guitar Hero 5.

Critical reception
David Giles from Music Week wrote, "Debut from a New York vocalist who has astonishingly managed to reproduce the classic sound of Al Green in full flight. His voice isn't quite as syrupy, naturally, but he's got the woozy Hammond organ and the fat brass down to a tee. And the song itself isn't at all bad either."

Track listings
 CD / 12"
"Let Love Rule" – 5:42
"Empty Hands" – 4:42
"Blues For Sister Someone" – 3:00
"Flower Child" – 2:56

 CD / 12" another version
"Let Love Rule" – 5:42
"Cold Turkey" (Live) at Los Angeles – 5:25
"My Precious Love" (Live) at New York – 3:00

 7"
A. "Let Love Rule"
B. "Empty Hands"

 Limited Edition 10"
A. "Let Love Rule" – 5:39
B1. "If Six Were Nine" – 6:44
B2. "My Precious Love" – 7:08

Charts

Members
 Lenny Kravitz – vocals, guitar, bass, drums
 Henry Hirsch – organ
 Karl Denson – saxophone

References

Lenny Kravitz songs
1989 singles
Song recordings produced by Lenny Kravitz
Songs written by Lenny Kravitz
Virgin Records singles
1989 songs